Port Xanatath is a 1980 role-playing game adventure for Traveller published by Group One.

Plot summary
Port Xanatath is the third in Group One's series of Traveller adventures, taking place aboard an ex-alien pirate base.

Publication history
Port Xanatath was published in 1981 by Group One as a 20-page book with a map.

Reception
William A. Barton reviewed Port Xanatath in The Space Gamer No. 36. Barton commented that "I believe Port Xanatath should prove useful to most Traveller refs - even if only as a source of ideas rather than as an actual adventure. Even those who were less than thrilled with the two earlier adventures might consider giving this one a try."

References

Role-playing game supplements introduced in 1980
Traveller (role-playing game) adventures